This is a list of electoral results for the electoral district of Dundas in Victorian state elections.

Members for Dundas

Election results

Elections in the 1970s

Elections in the 1960s

Elections in the 1950s

Elections in the 1940s

Elections in the 1930s

Elections in the 1920s

Elections in the 1910s

References

Victoria (Australia) state electoral results by district